The 2017 Patriot League women's soccer tournament was the postseason women's soccer tournament for the Patriot League held from October 31 through November 5, 2017. The quarterfinals of the tournament will be held at campus sites, while the semifinals and final took place at Glenn Warner Soccer Facility in Annapolis, Maryland. The six-team single-elimination tournament consisted of three rounds based on seeding from regular season conference play. The defending champions were the Bucknell Bison and they successfully defended their title, defeating the Navy Midshipmen in the conference final. The conference championship was the fourth for the Bucknell women's soccer program and the second for head coach Kelly Cook.

Bracket

Schedule

Quarterfinals

Semifinals

Final

Statistics

Goalscorers 

4 Goals
 Ash Fairow - Navy

3 Goals
 Kendall Ham - Bucknell

1 Goal
 Jacki Carty - Boston 
 Alex Catanzarite - Bucknell
 Emily Crichlow - Colgate
 Clare Macadam - Navy

See also 
 2017 Patriot League Men's Soccer Tournament

References

External links 

 
Patriot League Women's Soccer Tournament